The 2013 Chinese Taipei Open Grand Prix Gold was the ninth grand prix gold and grand prix tournament of the 2013 BWF Grand Prix Gold and Grand Prix. The tournament was held in Hsing Chuang Gymnasium, Taipei, Chinese Taipei September 3 until September 8, 2013 and had a total purse of $200,000.

Men's singles

Seeds

  Nguyen Tien Minh (final)
  Chou Tien-chen (quarter-final)
  Viktor Axelsen (quarter-final)
  Alamsyah Yunus (second round)
  Hsu Jen-hao (semi-final)
  Mohd Arif Abdul Latif (first round)
  Tan Chun Seang (second round)
  Anand Pawar (second round)
  Lee Dong-keun (first round)
  Suppanyu Avihingsanon (third round)
  Derek Wong Zi Liang (third round)
  Ashton Chen Yong Zhao (second round)
  Misha Zilberman (third round)
  Zulfadli Zulkiffli (third round)
  Arvind Bhat (withdrew)
  Howard Shu (first round)

Finals

Top half

Section 1

Section 2

Section 3

Section 4

Bottom half

Section 5

Section 6

Section 7

Section 8

Women's singles

Seeds

  Sung Ji-hyun (champion)
  Tai Tzu-ying (final)
  Lindaweni Fanetri (first round)
  Bae Youn-joo (quarter-final)
  Sapsiree Taerattanachai (quarter-final)
  Nichaon Jindapon (withdrew)
  Porntip Buranaprasertsuk (quarter-final)
  Busanan Ongbumrungpan (semi-final)

Finals

Top half

Section 1

Section 2

Bottom half

Section 3

Section 4

Men's doubles

Seeds

  Ko Sung-hyun / Lee Yong-dae (quarter-final)
  Kim Ki-jung / Kim Sa-rang (champion)
  Shin Baek-cheol / Yoo Yeon-seong (semi-final)
  Lee Sheng-mu / Tsai Chia-hsin (final)
  Mohd Zakry Abdul Latif / Mohd Fairuzizuan Mohd Tazari (quarter-final)
  Gan Teik Chai / Ong Soon Hock (first round)
  Liao Kuan-hao / Liang Jui-wei (quarter-final)
  Yohanes Rendy Sugiarto / Muhammad Ulinnuha (second round)

Finals

Top half

Section 1

Section 2

Bottom half

Section 3

Section 4

Women's doubles

Seeds

  Jung Kyung-eun / Kim Ha-na (champion)
  Lee So-hee / Shin Seung-chan (final)
  Ko A-ra / Yoo Hae-won (semi-final)
  Ng Hui Ern / Ng Hui Lin (quarter-final)
  Reika Kakiiwa / Miyuki Maeda (quarter-final)
  Jang Ye-na / Kim So-young (quarter-final)
  Shinta Mulia Sari / Yao Lei (second round)
  Wang Rong / Zhang Zhibo (semi-final)

Finals

Top half

Section 1

Section 2

Bottom half

Section 3

Section 4

Mixed doubles

Seeds

  Muhammad Rijal / Debby Susanto (second round)
  Sudket Prapakamol / Saralee Thoungthongkam (quarter-final)
  Shin Baek-cheol / Jang Ye-na (champion)
  Danny Bawa Chrisnanta / Vanessa Neo Yu Yan (second round)

Finals

Top half

Section 1

Section 2

Bottom half

Section 3

Section 4

References

Chinese Taipei Open
Chinese Taipei Open Grand Prix Gold
BWF Grand Prix Gold and Grand Prix
2013 in Taiwanese sport